Code protection may refer to:
 In computing, source code protection in which proprietary code is compiled, encrypted or obfuscated to conceal its inner workings from end users or competitors.
 In embedded microprocessors, hardware copy protection schemes by which firmware programmed into a microcontroller may be executed internally but is not readable or easily duplicated.
 In telephony, exchange code protection to prevent the same number being assigned in two small border communities on opposite sides of a telephone area code boundary. This allows local calls between the two communities without dialling the area code.